Lisa Filipetto is an Australian diplomat appointed by António Guterres on 8 February 2018 as Head of the United Nations Support Office in Somalia (UNSOS) to succeed Hubert Hudson Price II.

She was resident Ambassador to Ethiopia, with concurrent responsibility for relations with the African Union, Intergovernmental Authority on Development (IGAD) and Djibouti from 2010 to 2014.  She served as Australia's High Commissioner to Kenya and Ambassador to the United Nations Environment Programme (UNEP) and the United Nations Human Settlements Programme (UN-Habitat), as well as non-resident accreditation High Commissioner to Rwanda, United Republic of Tanzania and Uganda, and Ambassador to the African Union, Burundi and Djibouti from 2007 until 2010.  She also served as Ambassador to Cambodia (2004‑2010), Consul-General, Ho Chi Minh City, Viet Nam (1997–2001), as well as in Ireland (1991–1994) and Brunei Darussalam (1986–1988).

Filipetto earned a Master of Arts in international relations from Deakin University in Australia, as well as Bachelor of Economics and Bachelor of Arts in Asian studies from Australian National University.

References

Australian women ambassadors
Ambassadors of Australia to Ethiopia
Representatives of Australia to the African Union
Ambassadors of Australia to Djibouti
Ambassadors of Australia to Cambodia
High Commissioners of Australia to Kenya
Living people
Year of birth missing (living people)
Deakin University alumni
Australian National University alumni